Permeability of a space in a ship is the percentage of empty volume in that space.

Permeability is used in ship survivability and damaged stability calculations in ship design.  In this case, the permeability of a space is a percentage from 0 to 100.  Alternately, the permeability may be a coefficient from 0 to 1.  The permeability of a space is the percentage of volume of the space which may be occupied by seawater if the space is flooded.  The remaining volume [not filled with seawater] being occupied by machinery, cargo, accommodation spaces, etc.

Example
Typical values from the International Bulk Chemical Code are:

 0.95 for voids (empty spaces), tanks, and living spaces
 0.85 for machinery spaces
 0.60 for spaces allocated to stores.  

This implies that for damaged stability calculation purposes, machinery spaces are only 15% full with machinery by volume (100% - 85% = 15%).

References
 Title 46 U.S. Code of Federal Regulations

Nautical terminology